This is a list of the current permanent representatives to the United Nations at United Nations Headquarters, New York City. The list includes the country that they represent and the date that they presented their credentials to the UN Secretary-General. The list is sorted by the official order in which the flags are flown in front of UN buildings. This is also the seating arrangement in the General Assembly. Permanent representatives are also appointed to the United Nations Offices in Geneva, Vienna, and Nairobi; and permanent delegates to specialized agencies of the UN, such as FAO Headquarters in Rome, Italy and UNESCO Headquarters in Paris, France.

United Nations member states

United Nations General Assembly observers

Non-member observer states
(as of 3 September 2020)

Intergovernmental organizations

Other entities
Listed below are representatives from organizations, not sovereign states, described by the United Nations as "Other entities having received a standing invitation to participate as observers in the sessions and the work of the General Assembly and maintaining permanent offices at Headquarters." (as of 28 July 2019)

See also 

 Outline of the United Nations
 List of United Nations organizations by location
 List of current foreign ministers
 List of female foreign ministers

References 

United Nations
 

Diplomatic missions in the United States
permanent representatives to the United Nations